Run (stylized as RUN) is a 2020 South Korean television entertainment program starring Ji Sung, Kang Ki-young, Hwang Hee and Lee Tae-sun. It aired on tvN on Thursdays at 23:00 (KST) in January 2020.

Overview
Four actors exercise in  Seoul, Milan and Florence with the goal of running the full 42.195 km of the 36th Florence Marathon.

Cast

Main
 Ji Sung
 Kang Ki-young
 Hwang Hee
 Lee Tae-sun

Special appearances
 Kim Jae-joong (Ep. 1)
 Lee Bong-ju (Ep. 3)

Results

Production
Filming started in Bukchon Hanok Village, Seoul in October 2019, less than a month before the marathon day.

Ratings
In this table,  represent the lowest ratings and  represent the highest ratings.

Notes

References

External links
  

TVN (South Korean TV channel) television dramas
2020 South Korean television series debuts
2020 South Korean television series endings
Korean-language television shows
South Korean variety television shows
South Korean reality television series
South Korean travel television series